Hasanul Haq Inu (born 12 November 1946) is a Bangladeshi politician and the former Minister of Information of Bangladesh. He leads a faction of the Jatiya Samajtantrik Dal and was involved in a Marxist insurgency in the 1970s.

Early life and education
Inu was born in Bheramara, Kushtia District to A H M Qamrul Haq, an employee of Karnaphuli Paper Mills, and Begum Hasna Hena Haq. Inu graduated with a degree in chemical engineering from the East Pakistan University of Engineering and Technology in 1970.

Political career
Inu joined Bangladesh Chhatra League in 1968, and was appointed the general secretary of its Engineering University unit in 1969.

1972–1975
After the independence of Bangladesh Bangladesh Chhatra League, the student wing of the Bangladesh Awami League split following ideological differences between Sheikh Mujibur Rahman's nephew Sheikh Fazlul Haque Mani, forming Jatiya Samajtantrik Dal, led by Serajul Alam Khan. Hasanul Haq Inu joined this faction.

The party called for establishing socialism through an armed revolution. It had an armed wing, Gonobahini, which led a violent insurgency against the government of Sheikh Mujibur Rahman. In 1974, Hasanul Haq Inu led a group of armed men to attack the residence of the then Home Minister Mansur Ali, which resulted in the 1974 Ramna massacre. He also distributed anti-government leaflets.

After the assassination of Sheikh Mujibur Rahman
After the assassination of Sheikh Mujibur Rahman and his family in 1975, Inu along with Gonobahini's military leader Colonel Abu Taher rescued army chief Ziaur Rahman from house arrest, to facilitate a Marxist takeover of power. On 7 November 1975, Inu led assault on the Indian high commission to kidnap the high Commissioner Samar Sen.
Ziaur Rahman realised that the disorder set off by the soldiers' mutiny had to be suppressed firmly if discipline was to be restored in the army. Ziaur Rahman declared martial law and cracked down on the Jatiyo Samajtantrik Dal. Abu Taher was sentenced to death by a military tribunal on charges of treason, and Inu was sentenced to life in prison.

Since 2008
Inu was elected from Kushtia-2 in the Bangladesh Parliament. He is the president of a faction of the Jatiyo Samajtantrik Dal, which is a member of the Awami League led coalition government in Bangladesh. He was appointed minister of Information in 2012, replacing Abul Kalam Azad. This appointment occurred despite protests from senior Awami League leaders.

2018 
As an only Bangladesh Government high ranking minister Hasanul Haq publicly protested Bharatiya Janata Party president Amit Shah's remarks, describing Bangladeshis as ‘termites’. In a strong word, Inu said in a public rally   “Amit Shah has made an unwanted remark by describing Bangladeshis as termites. We in Dhaka do not give any importance to his statement as it does not carry the gravity of an official statement of India". His comments were widely reported in Indian media and welcomed by Bangladesh social media users. Other opposition leaders also hold him responsible for Sheikh Mujib's killing.

When commenting on Inu's activities in 1972– 1975, Bangladesh Nationalist Party leader Ruhul Kabir Rizvi said: "Inu's attitude at that time was like that of militant kingpins Laden, Zawahiri and Shaykh Abdur Rahman." He also demanded his trial for his crimes before a people's court.

References

{{|url=http://bdnews24.com/politics/2016/06/13/awami-league-will-have-to-atone-for-making-a-jasod-leader-minister-says-syed-ashraf |newspaper=bdnews24.com |date=13 June 2016 |access-date=11 July 2016}}

Living people
1946 births
People from Kushtia District
Notre Dame College, Dhaka alumni
Bangladesh University of Engineering and Technology alumni
Bangladeshi communists
10th Jatiya Sangsad members
Jatiya Samajtantrik Dal politicians
Information ministers of Bangladesh
11th Jatiya Sangsad members
9th Jatiya Sangsad members